Revolution Brewing is a brewery in Chicago, Illinois. It was founded as a brewpub in 2010 on Milwaukee Avenue in the Logan Square neighborhood. A separate production brewery, with canning and bottling lines and a tap room, opened in 2012 about a mile from the brewpub, on Kedzie Avenue in the Avondale neighborhood.

History
Revolution Brewing was started as a brewpub in 2010 by owner Josh Deth. Deth attended the University of Michigan and became interested in brewing from his frequent visits to Bell's Brewery. Deth worked at Goose Island Brewery and connected with head brewmaster Jim Cibak during his time there. Cibak has worked at a number of breweries including Three Floyds Brewing.

Revolution Brewing has received local and national recognition with awards from the Great American Beer Festival, World Beer Cup, and Time Out Chicago.

The film Drinking Buddies is partly set in the Revolution Brewing brewery and taphouse. A romantic comedy-drama, written and directed by Joe Swanberg, it was shot in 2012 and released in 2013. It stars Olivia Wilde, Jake Johnson, Anna Kendrick, and Ron Livingston. In the movie, the fictional characters portrayed by Wilde and Johnson work at the brewery.

Beers
Revolution Brewing produces more than 20 different beers.  Some of them are available year-round, and others are seasonal.  There are also several dozen more beers that were brewed at different times in the past.

Awards
2013
Chicagoist Beer of The Week: A Little Crazy
Time Out Chicago 2013 Eat Out Awards - Best Chicago Microbrewery
Chicagoland Brewpub & Microbrewery Shootout - 1st Place - Best Food/Beer Pairing
Chicago Tribune Dining Awards -Beverage Maker of the Year
2012
Great American Beer Festival - Gold Medal - English-Style Summer Ale: Cross of Gold; Bronze Medal - American-Belgo-Style Ale: A Little Crazy
Best of Chicago - Readers' Poll - Best Brewpub; Best Pub Grub
World Beer Cup - Gold - American Style Stout: Rise; Gold - English Style Summer Ale: Cross of Gold
Chicago Beer Society's 35th Annual Fall Tasting - 1st Place (tie) — Rise Hoppy, American Stout
RateBeer list of best brewpubs of 2012
2011
Chicago Magazine: 36 Best Local Craft Beers - Top 36 — Bottom Up Wit, Top 36 — Eugene Porter
The Reader: Best of Chicago - Readers Poll: Best Brewpub
Ratebeer.com Top New Brewers in the World - Top Five 
Chicagoland Brewpub & Microbrewery Shootout - Best Beer/Food Pairing 
Festival of Barrel Aged Beers - Silver: Classic Porter/Stout — Black Power Oatmeal Stout, Bronze: *Classic Porter/Stout — The General Molasses Porter
2010
The Reader: Best of Chicago - Readers Poll: Best Brewpub
Eat Out Awards - Best New Gastropub 
Chicago Magazine: Best of Chicago - Best Beer of 2010 — Eugene Porter

See also
 List of breweries in Illinois

References

External links

Beer brewing companies based in Chicago
Restaurants in Chicago